Juan de la Corte, a Spanish painter of Flemish origin, who was born in Antwerp, Flanders in c. 1590. He was instructed by Velazquez, and painted portraits and history, but chiefly
excelled in battle-pieces and perspective views. He also painted small pictures of subjects from sacred history. He was painter to King Phillip III, and was continued in that situation by his successor, King Philip IV. There are several of his pictures in the palace of Buen Retiro. He died at Madrid in 1660.

References

External links
Juan de la Corte at Hermitage

1597 births
1660 deaths
17th-century Spanish painters
Spanish male painters
Artists from Madrid
Court painters
Spanish people of Flemish descent